IMSC may refer to:

Organizations
 International Maritime Security Construct, a US-led coalition formed in 2019 and focused on the Arabian Gulf
 Institute of Mathematical Sciences (India), a research institute in Chennai, India
 Integrated Media Systems Center on the campus of University of Southern California, Los Angeles, United States
 International Military Sports Council
 International Moss Stock Center, an international resource center in Freiburg i. Br., Germany

Broadcasting and Internet Video formats
 Internet Media Subtitles and Captions, is a set of specifications on how to manage Subtitles and Captions in MPEG CMAF, IMF, ATSC, DVB TTML, HbbTV, on iOS,...

Cellular networking
 Instant message service center, a network element in the mobile telephone network which delivers instant messages

Other
 The International Mass Spectrometry Conference organised by the International Mass Spectrometry Foundation